The 1965 Summer Deaflympics, officially known as the 10th Summer Deaflympics, is an international multi-sport event that was celebrated from June 27 to July 3, 1965, in Washington D.C., United States. This is the first Deaflympics to be hosted outside of Europe, and the first Deaflympics to be hosted in Americas.

Sports 

 Athletics
 Basketball
 Cycling
 Diving
 Football
 Shooting
 Swimming
 Table Tennis
 Tennis
 Wrestling

References

 1965 Summer Deaflympics 

Deaflympics
International sports competitions hosted by the United States
Summer Deaflympics
Summer Deaflympics
Sports in Washington, D.C.
Parasports in the United States